Shyroka Balka may refer to:
 Shyroka Balka, a settlement in Donetsk Oblast, Ukraine
 Shyroka Balka, Bilozerka Raion, a village in Kherson Oblast, Ukraine
 Shyroka Balka, Bilyayivka Raion, a village in Odessa Oblast, Ukraine